The flag of the state of Vermont displays the coat of arms and motto of the U.S. state of Vermont ("Freedom and Unity") on a rectangular blue background. The Vermont General Assembly adopted this flag on June 1, 1923.

Multiple versions of the flag have been used throughout history. Originally, the flag was the flag of the Green Mountain Boys. It was then changed to look similar to the flag of the United States, with red and white stripes and a blue canton. It was changed again to be dissimilar to avoid confusion. Proposals have been considered to revert the flag to the Green Mountain Boys' design, but none have succeeded.

Symbolism
The flag consists of the state's coat of arms and motto on a field of azure. While the pine needle supporters of the coat of arms are represented throughout New England and symbolizes the small pine branches worn at the Battle of Plattsburgh near the end of the War of 1812, the pine tree in the middle of the coat of arms represents the Vermont forests. The cow and three sheaves of wheat represent the dairy and agriculture industries. The deer head on top represents Vermont's wildlife. The Green Mountains are in the background as well. The motto, "Freedom and Unity", is also used. The motto balances two different ideals, the freedom of the individual citizen, and the welfare of the common good.

History

There is no extant record of a design for an official Vermont flag prior to 1804, although Ira Allen's design—common to both the Great Seal of Vermont and the coat of arms of Vermont—dates to 1778. While an official government flag might not have existed prior to 1804, the Vermont militia—known as the Green Mountain Boys—was formed in 1770, and remaining accounts record use of the flag of the Green Mountain Boys as far back as 1777.

On May 1, 1804, the number of U.S. states rose to seventeen, and it was expected that the U.S. flag would change to 17 stars and 17 stripes. In anticipation, Vermont adopted the expected new U.S. flag design with the addition of the name "VERMONT" embroidered along the top. The U.S. flag did not add any stripes, resulting in the Vermont flag having more stripes than the national flag.

On October 20, 1837, Vermont changed its flag to a design based on the 13-stripe U.S. flag, but with the multiple stars of the blue canton replaced with a single large star surrounding Vermont's coat of arms. The flags based on these specifications varied in the number of points on the star (five and eight, with eight slightly more common), and the exact details of the center of the star (with either the Great Seal or the coat of arms being used).

During the American Civil War, the Spanish–American War and World War I, the Vermont militia fought under a banner composed of the coat of arms of Vermont on a blue field. This was essentially the same as the Vermont governor's flag, and very similar to the current state flag.

Because of confusion between the striped Vermont state flag and the U.S. flag, the design of the Vermont governor's flag was adopted as the official state flag on June 1, 1923.

See also
 State of Vermont
 Symbols of the State of Vermont
 Great Seal of the State of Vermont
 Flags of the United States

References

External links
 

Vermont
Symbols of Vermont
Vermont
Vermont